MFC 21: Hard Knocks was a mixed martial arts event held by the Maximum Fighting Championship (MFC) on May 15, 2009 in Enoch, Alberta.

Fight Card

See also
 Maximum Fighting Championship
 List of Maximum Fighting Championship events
 2009 in Maximum Fighting Championship

References

21
2009 in mixed martial arts
Mixed martial arts in Canada
Sport in Alberta
2009 in Canadian sports